"Y Tú También Llorarás" is a ballad written and produced by British singer-songwriter Albert Hammond, co-written by Anahí van Zandweghe, and performed by Venezuelan singer-songwriter and actor José Luis Rodríguez "El Puma". It was released as the first single from his studio album Señor Corazón (1987). This song became his first number one hit in the Billboard Hot Latin Tracks chart, and was later covered by Raulín Rosendo.

The song debuted on the Billboard Hot Latin Tracks chart at number 24 on 7 November 1987 and climbed to the top of the chart four weeks later. It spent six weeks at number-one, replacing "Qué No Se Rompa la Noche" by Spanish performer Julio Iglesias and being replaced by "Soy Así" by Mexican performer José José. "Y Tú También Llorarás" spent 24 weeks on the chart and ranked at number three in the Hot Latin Tracks Year-End Chart of 1988.

Charts

References

1987 singles
1987 songs
José Luis Rodríguez (singer) songs
Songs written by Albert Hammond
Spanish-language songs
PolyGram singles
1980s ballads
Pop ballads